Radow may refer to:
 Radow, Iran (disambiguation)
 Radów, Poland